House by the River is a 1950 American crime melodrama directed by Fritz Lang and starring Louis Hayward, Lee Bowman and Jane Wyatt. It is based on the 1921 novel of the same title by A. P. Herbert.

Plot
A rich novelist, Stephen Byrne, who lives and works by a river, accidentally kills his attractive maid after she begins screaming when he makes a drunken pass.  The writer manipulates his brother, John, who is physically impaired with a limp, to help him dispose of the body. Making use of a sack, which Stephen has borrowed from John for carrying firewood, they stuff the maid inside and dump her into the river. Days later, the sack and body float up and pass Stephen's house.  He goes onto the water and desperately tries to retrieve it, but fails. The police recover the bundle and, because John's initials have been stencilled on the sack, it is all traceable to him.

An inquest is held and, to Stephen's great pleasure, a cloud of suspicion hangs over John, who is tortured by his role in the situation and contemplates suicide. He and Stephen's wife, Marjorie, harbour feelings for each other. Stephen, meanwhile, has used the maid's disappearance and death as publicity for his books. Looking to reap great financial gain, he begins writing a novel specifically about the crime; in it he implicates himself.

The circumstances are resolved after Stephen resorts to deliberate attempts at murder.

Cast
 Louis Hayward as Stephen Byrne
 Jane Wyatt as Marjorie Byrne
 Lee Bowman as John Byrne
 Dorothy Patrick as Emily Gaunt
 Ann Shoemaker as Mrs. Ambrose
 Jody Gilbert as Flora Bantam
 Peter Brocco as Harry – Coroner
 Howland Chamberlain as District Attorney
 Margaret Seddon as Mrs. Whittaker – Party Guest
 Sarah Padden as Mrs. Beach
 Kathleen Freeman as Effie Ferguson – Party Guest
 Will Wright as Inspector Sarten
 Leslie Kimmell as Mr. Gaunt
 Effie Laird as Mrs. Gaunt
 Bob Burns as Courtroom Spectator (Uncredited)

Production background 
Director Fritz Lang wanted to make the character of the murdered maid an African American woman, but the Hays Office was against it as sexual desire between blacks and whites was seen as problematic.

Reception

Critical response
When the film was first released, film critic for The New York Times, Bosley Crowther, panned the film, writing, "... we fear that neither the enlightenment nor the excitement that a customer might expect in such a flickering melodrama is provided by this film ... the script by Mel Dinelli, based on a novel by A. P. Herbert, is shy on genuine melodrama, it provides little in the way of suspense (since you know that the killer is bound to get his) and it comes to a weak and cheerless end. It seems that the killer is a novelist and unconsciously writes an exposure in his new book. This is about as measly a way to catch a man as we know."

More recently, film critic Tom Vick praised the film, writing, "Lang beautifully evokes the Victorian era with his customary attention to detail. Cinematographer Edward J. Cronjager's low-key lighting fills the Byrnes mansion with appropriately gloomy shadows, and the moonlit river scenes make it seem as if nature itself is offended by the crime. Avant-garde composer George Antheil's haunting score is the perfect accompaniment to this chilling and unconventional exercise in suspense."

See also
 List of American films of 1950

References

External links
 
 
 
 
 

1950 films
1950 crime drama films
1950s historical films
American crime drama films
American historical films
American black-and-white films
Film noir
Films set in the 19th century
Films directed by Fritz Lang
Films scored by George Antheil
Films based on British novels
1950s English-language films
1950s American films